Osteospermum fruticosum , also called the trailing African daisy or shrubby daisybush, is a shrubby, semi-succulent herbaceous flowering plant native to South Africa, belonging to the small tribe Calenduleae of the sunflower family (Asteraceae).

The dark-centered daisy-like flowers range in color from deep purple to white. Some hybrid growers have bred pale yellow-flowering strains. The plant is a perennial in mild climates.

Osteospermum fruticosum has been classified as a weed in New Zealand where it is now a widespread coastal plant, particularly in the North Island.

References

Calenduleae
Flora of South Africa
Taxa named by Carl Linnaeus